Gilles Morda (4 April 1946 – 27 September 2003) was a French bobsledder. He competed in the four man event at the 1972 Winter Olympics.

References

External links
 

1946 births
2003 deaths
French male bobsledders
Olympic bobsledders of France
Bobsledders at the 1972 Winter Olympics
Place of birth missing